Bethel Cemetery may refer to the following places:
Bethel Cemetery (Denton, Arkansas), listed on the National Register of Historic Places
Bethel Cemetery (Kingston, Tennessee), listed on the National Register of Historic Places
Bethel Cemetery and Church, a Kentucky Landmark in Pendleton County